Economic violence is any act or behaviour which causes economic harm to an individual. Economic violence can take the form of, for example, property damage, restricting access to financial resources, education or the labour market, or not complying with economic responsibilities, such as alimony. In some circumstances the individuals may be service workers such as undocumented workers and food service workers, in others they may be spouses, or closeted LGBT people. The World Health Organization defines it as being a form of collective violence, committed by larger groups towards individuals. The term is frequently associated with, or credited to, feminist theory, who term it as a broader form of violence beyond use or threats of physical force, to include sexual, psychological and economic violence. In Argentinian law, it is defined as a form of domestic violence.

The term 'economic violence' developed from the term economic abuse which was first introduced in the late 1950s. It has commonly been used as a tool to dominate, manipulate and control with the intent to discourage one's ability to gain independence.

Economic violence against women 
The most common form of economic violence that occurs globally is economic violence towards women. The United Nations ESCWA defines it on its website as "Economic violence is said to occur when an individual denies his intimate partner access to financial resources, typically as a form of abuse or control or in order to isolate her or to impose other adverse consequences to her well-being." The domain of this form of violence is based on gender, causing the term 'economic violence' to be a subsection of other gender-based discrimination terms such as: gender-based violence, violence against women and girls, and human rights.

Economic violence against women appears differently around the world, but often includes limiting women's access to credit, funds, access to healthcare, employment, and education. This also includes excluding women from making financial decisions and leaving women out of traditional laws in regards to property ownership and use of land. One of the more recent examples of economic violence that occurred was in Turkey. This was recently observed in a study done at Sivas Cumhuriyet University. This studied occurred in the cities of Manisa, Konya and Ankara. In the study, women were admitted to the IVF Center in southwest Turkey where all were found to be exposed to economic violence. 

While economic violence against women occurs frequently and often times there are very few resources accessible to them, some places have begun to offer more resources for these women. An example of this includes the Redevelopment Opportunities for Women Economic Action Program that is located in St. Louis, Missouri. The REAP began by a combined effort of thirteen domestic violence agencies and three homeless service agencies providing women with economic services to help them escape the situations they are in.

Economic violence against immigrants 
Economic violence on a systemic or structural scale can be seen in the economic treatment of immigrants. In this medium, economic violence can be identified as access to economic advancement, wages, unemployment rates, and the exploitation of migrant bodies in the name of profit. In Western European countries where this trend is prevalent, the likelihood of being unemployed is twice as high for immigrants as it is for natives citizens. In a 2016 study of 587 immigrants and refugees seeking care at an Italian hospital, 38 people, or 18.9% of the sample, reported at least one instance of economic violence during their last 12 months spent in Italy. When focused on participants who were employed, over half of them reported experiencing economic violence. In some cases, the act of immigration itself, namely illegal immigration, is the site of violence. For example, in regards to the journey of undocumented-migrants through Mexico to the United States of America, researcher Wendy A. Vogt argues, "the journey across Mexico has become a site of intense violence and profit making...For example, while in transit, migrants may be valued in various combinations of cargo to smuggle, gendered bodies to sell, labor to exploit, organs to traffic, and lives to exchange for cash."

See also
 Class conflict
 Convention on preventing and combating violence against women and domestic violence (Article 3)
 Economic abuse
 Structural violence

References

Violence
Economic inequality